Aquinas College on Montefiore Hill, at Palmer Place, North Adelaide, is a residential college providing accommodation and support for Roman Catholic students at one or other of Adelaide's universities: University of Adelaide, Flinders University and the University of South Australia. The centrepiece of the establishment is "Montefiore", once the residence of Sir Samuel Way and (later) his family.

History
The building "Montefiore" was purchased by the Catholic Archdiocese of Adelaide in 1945 and in 1948 dedicated by the Bishop of Adelaide as a residential college for male Catholics studying at the University of Adelaide. It was intended to function in much the same way as the nearby St Mark's had served male Anglicans since 1925 and St Ann's had provided for females of any persuasion since 1947. In this respect Adelaide had fallen behind the other capital cities, according to the master of St Mark's, Dr A. Grenfell Price.

Father Cornelius P. Finn SJ, previously Dean of Newman College of the University of Melbourne, commenced his duties at the college on 17 January 1950.
The college, which was expected to cater for 50 students, opened in March 1950 with 20 enrolments.
Inter-college sporting contests began almost immediately, with the first cricket match being won by Aquinas.
Its official opening took place on Sunday 30 September 1951, when Archbishop Beovich performed the blessing ceremony and Sir Mellis Napier, Chancellor of Adelaide University, declared the college officially open. By this time there were 40 students and a "considerable waiting list".

In 1975 the all-male college became co-residential.

By 2020 there was accommodation at the college for 200 students.

List of rectors
Originally recruited from the Jesuits, from 2014 rectors of St Aquinas College were supplied by the Marist Brothers.
1950–1951: Rev. Cornelius Finn SJ
1952–1961: Rev. Michael Scott SJ
1962–1969: Rev. Bryan Buxton SJ
1970–1975: Rev. James McInerney SJ
1975–1982: Rev. Ian Howells SJ
1983–1986: Rev. Daven Day SJ
1986–1997: Rev. Theo Overberg SJ
1997–2000: Rev. Michael Head SJ
2001–2004: Rev. John Shanahan
2005–2006: Mr Sam Armstrong
2006–2011: Prof. Denis Ralph
2011–2013: Dr Colin MacMullin
2014: Brother John Furlong FMS (acting)
2015–2017: Brother Paul Gilchrist FMS
2018– : Brother Michael Green FMS

See also 
Catholic education in Australia

Notes and references

External links
 Aquinas College Website

1950 establishments in Australia
Residential colleges of the University of Adelaide
North Adelaide